I Komang Putra Adnyana is a former Indonesian football goalkeeper who played for Indonesia in the 2000 Asian Cup. Currently, he works as goalkeeper coach for PSIS Semarang.

I Komang played for PSIS Semarang for almost a decade, helping the team to league championships in 1999 and 2001. He also played for Arseto Solo, Persema Malang, Persela Lamongan and Persis Solo, the last club he played (also being made captain) before retiring.

Honours

Club
PSIS Semarang
 Liga Indonesia Premier Division: 1998–99
 Liga Indonesia First Division: 2001

International
 AFF Championship
 Runners-up (2) : 2000, 2002

References

External links

1972 births
Living people
Indonesian footballers
Indonesia international footballers
Sportspeople from Bali
People from Denpasar
Balinese people
Association football goalkeepers
Arseto F.C. players
PSIS Semarang players
Persema Malang players
Persela Lamongan players
Persis Solo players